Ahmad Amirabadi Farahani (born 1973) is an Iranian conservative politician and former military officer of Revolutionary Guards.

Amirabadi was born in Farahan near Tafresh in Markazi Province from Azerbaijani family. He is a member of the 9th and 10th Islamic Consultative Assembly from the electorate of Qom.

Affiliation
In 2006, he was listed by the Coalition of the Pleasant Scent of Servitude.

According to Donya-e-Eqtesad, Amirabadi Farahani is close to Front of Islamic Revolution Stability. He denied membership in the party in an interview with the Iranian Labour News Agency, although Iranian Diplomacy website calls him a "self-proclaimed member".

COVID-19 pandemic

On 24 February 2020, during the COVID-19 pandemic in Iran, Amirabadi Farahani claimed that there had been at least 50 COVID-19 deaths in Qom, while the deputy health minister Iraj Harirchi claimed that there had only been 12 COVID-19 deaths in the whole of Iran and only 61 confirmed cases of COVID-19.

References

People from Markazi Province
Living people
1973 births
Members of the 9th Islamic Consultative Assembly
Members of the 10th Islamic Consultative Assembly
Deputies of Qom
Iranian Azerbaijanis
Popular Front of Islamic Revolution Forces politicians
Coalition of the Pleasant Scent of Servitude politicians
Iranian city councillors
Volunteer Basij personnel of the Iran–Iraq War
Islamic Revolutionary Guard Corps officers